Presidential elections are expected to be held in Finland in early 2024. Voters will elect the President of the Republic to a six-year term. According to the constitution, President Sauli Niinistö cannot run for re-election, having served the maximum two terms.

If the new president is chosen on the first ballot by winning more than half of valid votes cast, their term will begin on 1 February 2024. Should the election go to a second ballot, the term will begin on 1 March 2024.

According to a poll conducted by Ilta-Sanomat in 2022, Mika Aaltola, political scientist and the director of the Finnish Institute of International Affairs, is currently the most popular candidate for the 13th president of Finland in 2024, which would make him Finland's first president elected from outside politics. After him, the next most popular are Foreign Minister Pekka Haavisto and the Governor of the Bank of Finland, Olli Rehn.

Requirements
According to the first paragraph of Section 54 of the Finnish Constitution, "The President shall be a native-born Finnish citizen."

Candidates
In 2019 Paavo Väyrynen announced that he would run as a candidate for the 2024 elections.

In 2022 Movement Now chose its chairman Hjallis Harkimo as its presidential candidate for the 2024 elections.

Opinion polls

Potential candidates

References

External links

Presidential elections in Finland
Finland
President
2024 in Finland
January 2024 events in Europe